Dr. Andrew Pike, OAM (born 1 January 1946) is an Australian film historian, film distributor and exhibitor, and documentary producer and director. Pike formed Ronin Films, an Australian film distribution company, with his first wife, Dr Merrilyn Fitzpatrick, in 1974. With Ross Cooper, he co-authored the book, Reference Guide to Australian Films 1906–1969 and has produced and directed many documentaries since 1982. Pike has been honoured with numerous awards including a plaque on the ACT Honour Walk in Canberra City, appointed of the Order of Australia (OAM) and an Honorary Doctorate from the University of Canberra.

Personal life

Pike was born in Adelaide, South Australia. He moved to Canberra in 1963 to obtain a B.A. (Hons) and M.A. in Australian history at the Australian National University.

Career 

After completing an M.A. on the history of Australian cinema at the Australian National University in Canberra, Pike worked as a cinema manager. During this time, he wrote many articles on film, which were published in journals and newspapers.

Pike was then given the opportunity to work for three years as a Consultant to the film collection of the National Library of Australia. This included the acquisition of films for study purposes in schools and universities. His next position was as a Research Fellow in the Department of Pacific and South-East Asian History at the Australian National University. Between 1989 and 1992, he was a board member of the Australian Film Commission.

In 1999 Pike was instrumental to the founding of the Friends of the National Film and Sound Archive, an association dedicated to supporting the Archive's work and to promote the principles of best practice in the film archive profession. He was elected President of the association in 2004.

Pike has a keen interest in policy issues affecting the film industry and is a frequent contributor to debates on industry issues. For example, he instigated forums on film culture at both the Sydney and Melbourne Film Festivals in 2000. He was also engaged as a consultant on regional cinemas by the New South Wales Film and Television Office and is active in promoting an expansion of audiences and a wider public appreciation of all aspects of cinema. He has a regular segment on ABC radio talking about film history.

In 2003 Pike was a Founding Member and Secretary of the ACT Film and Television Council.  From 2008 to 2012, he was a member of the ACT Government's Cultural Council, advising the Arts Minister on arts policy and strategies. He also served as Chairman of the ACT Screen Investment Fund for the ACT Government, and has chaired the MPA APSA film development fund for the Asia Pacific Screen Academy from 2010 to 2015.

Ronin Films and Electric Shadows 

In 1974, Pike formed Ronin Films with Merrilyn Fitzpatrick.  The Canberra-based company was involved in many innovative distribution and marketing activities. In its first two decades, the company imported to Australia 120 feature films from Europe and Asia, and distributed many Australian films, including the feature films Strictly Ballroom, Shine and Road to Nhill, which achieved national success. The firm also developed an interest in films from China and Japan, importing many films from the Chinese "Fifth Generation" directors in the 1980s, and organising many Chinese directors to visit Australia including Chen Kaige, Wu Tianming, Zhang Zeming, Huang Jianxin and Tian Zhuangzhuang.  The firm was actively involved in the beginnings of the French Film Festival in Sydney in the 1990s, and frequently worked with the Alliance Francaise and the French Embassy to host festivals and other French film events at Ronin's cinemas.  As an exhibitor, the company ran several art cinemas including the Academy Cinema in Sydney for four years during the early 1990s, and Electric Shadows Cinemas in Canberra from 1979 to 2006. For many years Pike wrote programme notes for a weekly newsletter that was emailed to 4,500 cinema patrons in Canberra.

Ronin is a leading distributor of documentaries and specialises in the educational market. Their collection includes many films from the CAAMA (Central Australian Aboriginal Media Association) collection.

Author 

Pike researched and co-authored (with Ross Cooper) the book  Reference guide to Australian films 1906–1969, published by Oxford University Press in 1980 and Australian Film 1900-1977 in 1998.

He also co-authored with Ray Edmondson, Australia's Lost Films: The loss and rescue of Australia’s silent cinema.

Filmography 

Angels of War (co-director with Hank Nelson and Gavan Daws) in 1982. The film was an award-winning documentary about the experiences of the people of Papua New Guinea in World War II. It was broadcast by ABC TV and won several awards including the Golden Sesterce for Best Documentary at the Nyon Film Festival (Switzerland) and Best Documentary in the Australian Film Institute's annual awards.

Man Without Pigs (Co-producer with Chris Owen) in 1990. The film, directed by Chris Owen, offers insight into the dynamics of village life in Papua New Guinea and the antagonism aroused when conflict between traditional custom and Western values occurs in an isolated community. The film won the Best Documentary Award at the Hawaii Film Festival and was broadcast by SBS in Australia.

Oh, Beethoven! (Producer) in 1999. The documentary follows Dr Susan West and the children from Ainslie Primary School, Canberra, in a special performance of a work about Beethoven's life. This is followed by discussion about Dr West's innovative approach to music education.

Man of Strings  (Co-producer) in 1999.  Directed by Gary Kildea, this documentary portrays the life and work of Czech-born violinist, Jan Sedivka, a leading violinist and string teacher in Australia.

Betelnut Bisnis (Co-producer with Chris Owen) in 2006. This documentary, directed by Chris Owen, explores the life of a family in the Highlands of Papua New Guinea, who make a precarious living by trading in betelnut, one of the world's most widely used narcotics. The film presents us with a vivid portrait of present-day Papua New Guinea – the day-to-day realities of life for "grass roots" citizens.

Across The Plateau (Co-producer with his daughter, Harriet Pike) in 2007. This documentary, directed by Paul Liu and Zhang Zeming, is a bicycle story from China, about a group of friends in southern China who share cycling treks of epic scale. Their adventures are an expression of their sense of personal freedom in the new China, after a lifetime of political turmoil and personal struggle. The film was post-produced at Ronin's Canberra office. Eight international film festivals officially selected the film.

The Chifleys of Busby Street (Director)' in 2008.  This feature-length documentary, made with historian Dr Robin McLachlan, is a portrait of Australia's popular Prime Minister Ben Chifley, and his wife Elizabeth, and the memory of them kept alive in their home-town of Bathurst.

Electric Shadows: The Story of a Cinema (Co-producer with Harriet Pike) in 2009. This documentary looks at the history of the Electric Shadows cinema, and considers its emergence as something of an icon in the Canberra cultural scene.

Emily in Japan (Director) in 2009.  This documentary explores the behind-the-scenes story of a major exhibition of paintings by the Indigenous artist Emily Kame Kngwarreye which toured Japan attracting record crowds. The film was broadcast by ABC TV.

Into the Shadows (Consulting Producer) in 2009.  A feature-length documentary, directed by Andrew Scarano and Phil Hignett, about Australian cinema history, released nationally in cinemas by Ronin Films, and broadcast by ABC TV.

How To Run A School Concert (Director & producer) in 2010.  A short documentary telling the story behind a huge interactive concert for school children and the community, surveying international song through the ages. It was presented by the Music Education Program of the School of Music, Australian National University in Canberra.

Message from Mungo (Co-directed with Ann McGrath) in 2014.  This feature-length film explores the relationship between archeologists and Indigenous communities at Lake Mungo in the south-west of New South Wales, one of the world's richest archaeological sites.  The film won a media award from the United Nations Association of Australia, and has been invited to screen at many festivals.

Awards & Positions 

1986: The Australian Film institute's Byron Kennedy Award for contributions to the film industry.
1992:  A special award by the Australian Film Critics' Circle for contributions to the film industry.
2003: Appointed by the French Government to the rank of Chevalier dans L'Ordre des Arts et Lettres for his work in the distribution and exhibition of French cinema in Australia.
2004: Named by the Canberra Times as one of 75 Canberra citizens who have contributed to the shape and vitality of the local community.
2005: Plaque erected in the ACT Honour Walk in Canberra City, for contributions to the community.
2007: Medal in the Order of Australia (OAM) for services to the film industry and to the community.
2007: Honorary Doctorate from University of Canberra for services to the film industry and to the community.
2009: Jury member for the Asia Pacific Screen Awards.
2012: NSW Cinema Pioneer of the Year by Cinema Pioneers' Association.

References 

Living people
1946 births
People from Adelaide
Australian film producers
Recipients of the Medal of the Order of Australia